"Click Go the Shears" is a traditional Australian bush ballad. The song details a day's work for a sheep shearer in the days before machine shears.

Song
The enduring popularity of this song reflects the traditional role that the wool industry has played in Australian life. The song describes the various roles in the shearing shed, including the "ringer", the "boss of the board", the "colonial experience man" and the "tar boy". After the day's shearing, the "old shearer" takes his cheque and heads to the local pub for a drinking session.

The tune is the American Civil War song "Ring the Bell, Watchman" by Henry Clay Work and the first verse follows closely, in parody, Work's lyrics as well. It was actually originally named 'The Bare Bellied Ewe' and only became popular in the 1950s, more than half a century later.

The second verse in the original 19th-century song is as follows:

The usual chorus of the song is as follows:

In June 2013 folklorist Mark Gregory discovered that a version of the song was first published in 1891 in the regional Victorian newspaper the Bacchus Marsh Express under the title "The Bare Belled Ewe" and the tune given as "Ring the Bell Watchman." That version was signed "C. C. Eynesbury, Nov. 20, 1891," Eynesbury being a rural property located in the Bacchus Marsh area. It is possible that "C.C." was the author of the song.

There was a shearers' strike in 1891 so the publication of the song in that year would have resonated with the Australian community.

The song was next published in 1939 in two Australian newspapers and then in 1946 as a traditional song "collected and arranged" by Reverend Dr. Percy Jones, a professor of music. The lyrics vary widely; "bare-bellied yoe" (yoe is a dialect word for ewe) is often "bare-bellied joe" or even "blue-bellied ewe". The last line in the verse about the "colonial experience" man "smelling like a whore" is often bowdlerised to "smelling like a sewer" or completely rewritten.

The song has been recorded by many artists, notably by the American folk musician Burl Ives in 1958 on his album Australian Folk Songs. Another version was recorded by the British folklorist A. L. Lloyd. In January 2014 Chloe and Jason Roweth sang the 1891 version of the song for an ABC Television story.

When Australia replaced the pound with the dollar in 1966, a jingle that accompanied the switchover was written in the same tune as this song:

In 1973, when Gough Whitlam, the then-Australian Prime Minister at the time, visited the People's Republic of China, a PLA (People's Liberation Army) military band played Click Go the Shears when Whitlam stepped off his aircraft at Beijing Capital Airport. They reprised this welcome and respect at a state banquet for Whitlam the day after when they played a rendition of Slim Dusty's "On the Road to Gundagai".

See also
Tom Roberts
Sheep shearer
Rolf Harris
Reedy River

References

Australian folk songs
Slim Dusty songs
Australian country music songs
Year of song unknown
Australian sheep industry
Sheep shearing